Synnes is a surname. Notable people with the surname include:

Arne Synnes (born 1940), Norwegian politician
Harald Synnes (1931–2012), Norwegian politician
Marianne Synnes (born 1970), Norwegian scientist and politician

Norwegian-language surnames